Attorney General Lane may refer to:

Gary Lane (politician) (born 1942), Attorney General of Saskatchewan
William Preston Lane Jr. (1892–1967), Attorney General of Maryland

See also
General Lane (disambiguation)